Shahi Tegin, Tegin Shah or Sri Shahi (ruled 680-739 CE, known to the Chinese as 烏散特勤灑 Wusan Teqin Sa "Tegin Shah of Khorasan") was a king of the Turk Shahis, a dynasty of Western Turk or mixed Western Turk-Hephthalite origin who ruled from Kabul and Kapisa to Gandhara in the 7th to 9th centuries.

Context
Kabulistan was the heartland of the Turk Shahi domain, which at times included Zabulistan and Gandhara.

During their rule, the Turk Shahi were in constant conflict against the eastward expansion of the Umayyad Caliphate. About 650 CE, the Arabs captured Sistan, and started to attack Shahi territory from the west. They captured Kabul in 665 CE, but the Turk Shahis were able to mount a counter-offensive and repulsed the Arabs, taking back the areas of Kabul and Zabulistan (around Ghazni), as well as the region of Arachosia as far as Kandahar.

Rule
In 680 CE, Shahi Tegin succeeded Barha Tegin.  The Arabs again failed to capture Kabul and Zabulistan in 697-698 CE, and their general Yazid ibn Ziyad was killed in the action.

In 719/20 CE, the Tegin of Kabulistan (Tegin Shah) and the Iltäbär of Zabulistan sent a combined embassy to the Chinese Emperor of the Tang Dynasty in Xi'an to obtain confirmation of their thrones. The Chinese emperor signed an investiture decree, which was returned to the Turk rulers:

The word "Geluodazhi" in this extract (Chinese: 葛罗达支, pronounced in Early Middle Chinese: kat-la-dat-tcǐe), is thought to be a transliteration of the ethnonym Khalaj. Hence Tegin Shah was "Tegin of the Khalaj". This title also appears on his coinage in Gupta script, where he is named "hitivira kharalāča", probably meaning "Iltäbär of the Khalaj". In 720 CE, the ruler of Zabulistan (謝䫻, xieyu) also received the title Gedaluozhi Xielifa (Chinese: 葛達羅支頡利發), Xielifa being the known Chinese transcription of the Turkish "Iltäbär", hence "Iltäbär of the Khalaj". Overall, it seems that the Turk Shahi rulers were Khalaj Turks.

Tegin Shah abdicated in 739 CE in favour of his son Fromo Kesaro and sent an embassy through Central Asia in 719 CE:

References

Notes

Sources

 

Turkic dynasties
Dynasties of Afghanistan
Kabul Shahi